Caucasian Neopaganism is a category including movements of modern revival of the autochthonous religions of the indigenous peoples of the Caucasus. It has been observed by scholar Victor Schnirelmann especially among the Abkhaz and the Circassians.

Religions

Abkhaz native religion

The Abkhaz native religion, or Abkhaz Neopaganism, is the contemporary Neopagan re-emergence of the ethnic religion of the Abkhaz people in Abkhazia, a revitalisation which started in the 1980s. The most important holy sites of the religion are the Seven Shrines of Abkhazia, each one having its own priestly clan, where rituals and prayers began to be solemnly restored from the 1990s onward.

According to the 2003 census, 8% of the population of Abkhazia adheres to Abkhaz Paganism. On the 3rd of August 2012 the Council of Priests of Abkhazia was formally constituted in Sukhumi. The possibility to make the Abkhaz native religion one of the state religions was discussed in the following months.

Circassian Paganism

Circassian paganism, also called Khabzeism, is a pagan faith and one of the abandoned parts of Adyghe Xabze.

Description 
An important element is the belief in the soul (psa) of the ancestors, who have the ability to observe and evaluate the affairs of their offspring. The concept of physical pain or pleasure in the Hereafter (Hedryhe) is absent: the soul is granted spiritual satisfaction or remorse for one's chosen path in life in front of himself and his ancestors.

Therefore, the goal of man's earthly existence is the perfection of the soul, which corresponds to the maintenance of honour (nape), manifestation of compassion (guschlegu), gratuitous help (psape), which, along with valour, and bravery of a warrior, enables the human soul to join the soul of the ancestors with a clear conscience (nape huzhkle). The souls of the ancestors require commemoration: funeral feasts are arranged (hedeus) and sacrifice or memorial meal preparations (zheryme) are practiced and distributed for the remembrance of the dead souls.

The Habzist theology is monistic, with utmost prominence given to the god Tha (Тхьэ, tħa), Thashkhue (Тхьэшхуэ, tħaʃxʷa, also known as Theshxwe) or Thashkho (Тхьашхо), who begets the universe. First of all, Tha expresses himself generating the Word or cosmic Law (Khy), the primordial pattern from which all the beings form naturally, developing by internal laws. Enlightenment for men corresponds to an understanding of Tha's Law.

Thashkhue is omnipresent in his creation (coagulation); according to Adyghe cosmological texts, "his spirit is scattered throughout space". In Adyghe hymns Tha (Thashxue) is referred to as "the One everyone asks, but who doesn't ask back", "the multiplier of the non-existent", "on whom everyone places their hope, but who doesn’t place hope on anyone", "from whom the gifts come", "His amazing work", "the One who permits heaven and earth to move".
	 
Everything is one (Псори Зыщ, Psora Zysch, or Псори Хыщ, Psora Hysch), and is one with the Tha. The material-manifested world is in perpetual change, but at the same time there is a foundation that always remains unshaken. That is the originating principle of the world and its Law. The always-changing world and its basis is compared to a rotating wheel (дунейр шэрхъщи duneyr sherhschi, мэкlэрахъуэ meklerahue): although the wheel is constantly rotating (changing), it has its central hub around which it revolves, which remains still. Followers of this worldview, sometimes also Islamised, are found in modern day Turkey. The Xabze beliefs and Sufi-Islamic beliefs are seen as complementary philosophies by Circassians.

After Tha, the supreme god, there are secondary gods and goddess as:

 Hantseguash: The goddess of Water and rain
 Hedrikhe: the God of Death
 Heneguash: The goddess of Sea
 Hyateguash: the goddess of Beauty and Gardens
 Kodes: The god of Mountains
 Mezguash: The goddess of all Fauna
 Mezytha: The god of Forests, Hunt and Beasts
 Psetha: The god of Life and Souls
 Sataney: The goddess of Feminity and Fertiliy, The Mother of the Narts
 Schyble: The god of Lightning
 Sozresh: The god of Fertility and family
 Thageledj: The god of Flora and crops
 Tlepsh: The god of Fire, Blacksmiths, Steel and weapons
 Uashkhue: The god of Sky
 Zekuethash: The god of War

The Narts, demigods mentioned in the eponymous Saga with their mother Sataney. The gods and goddesses are divided into two fundamentally different groups:
 
Gods without image, cosmogonic (Thashkhue, Uashkhue, Psetha, Schyble).
Anthropomorphic (humanoid) gods (Mezytha, Tlepsh, Thagaledj, etc.).

See also
 Vainakh religion
 Germanic Neopaganism
 Baltic Neopaganism
 Ossetian Neopaganism
 Slavic Neopaganism
 Uralic Neopaganism

References

Bibliography
 Schnirelmann, Victor: “Christians! Go home”: A Revival of Neo-Paganism between the Baltic Sea and Transcaucasia. Journal of Contemporary Religion, Vol. 17, No. 2, 2002.
 Т. М. Катанчиев. Адыгэ кхабзэ как кабардинское обыхное право. Эль-Фа, 2001

External links
 Habze Portal 
 Circassian Association of California Adyghe Khasa